Zee Q was an Indian English cable and satellite television channel, owned by Zee Entertainment Enterprises. The channel was launched on 5 November 2012, for children in the 4 to 14 age group. The 24-hour channel was available on DTH and digital cable platforms as a paid channel and aired in India. The channel provided children with educational broadcasts, animated and live-action series, and movies.
The channel also featured a programming block of CBeebies shows.

Former Programming

Animated Series 

 3rd & Bird
 Aayu
 Amar Chitra Katha Heroes
 Bandbudh Aur Budbak
 Backyardigans
 Burka Avenger
 Bo On The Go!
 Charlie and Lola
 Chimpoo Simpoo
 Daniel Tiger's Neighborhood
 Dinosaur Train
 Franklin
 Fishtronaut
 He-Man and the Masters of the Universe
 Jack
 Pyaar Mohabbat Happy Lucky 
 Rolie Polie Olie
 Sid the Science Kid
 Zou

Live-action 

 Engineer This
 M.I. Four – The Multiple Intelligence quiz
 Satrangi
 Science with Brain Cafe
 Teenovation
 Teletubbies
 The Art Room
 The Weekly Wrap
 Word Match

References

External links
ZeeQ's official website

 Zee Entertainment Enterprises
 Hindi-language television channels in India
 Television channels and stations established in 2012
 Children's television networks
 Television stations in Mumbai
 Children's television channels in India
Hindi-language television stations
2012 establishments in Uttar Pradesh
Defunct television channels in India
Indian animation